Janine P. Geske (born May 12, 1949) is an American jurist and law professor who served as a justice of the Wisconsin Supreme Court from 1993 to 1998 and as interim Milwaukee County Executive in 2002.

Life and career
Born in Port Washington, Wisconsin, Geske was raised in the nearby community of Cedarburg.  She graduated from Cedarburg High School in 1967 and received her bachelor's and master's degrees from Beloit College in 1971 and 1972, respectively.  Geske earned her J.D. degree from the Marquette University Law School in 1975.

Geske worked as chief staff attorney for the Legal Aid Society of Milwaukee until 1979. She was an assistant professor at Marquette University Law School from 1978 to 1981 and was founding director of the Marquette University Law School's Clinic for the Elderly. From 1981 to 1993, Geske served as a Milwaukee County circuit court judge.  In 1993, she was appointed to the Wisconsin Supreme Court by Governor Tommy Thompson, a Republican. Geske was elected to a full term on the court in 1994 but resigned from the bench in 1998.

Following her departure from the court, Geske worked as a professor at Marquette University, holding the Association of Marquette University Women's Chair in Humanistic Studies in 2000 and 2001. From February to May 2002, she served as the interim Milwaukee County Executive, following the resignation of F. Thomas Ament amid a massive pension scandal. Later in 2002, Geske was appointed interim dean of the Marquette University Law School, serving until 2003. Geske has remained on the law school faculty and is on the faculty of the National Judicial College in Reno, Nevada. In both 1994 and 2002, the Milwaukee Bar honored her with its Lawyer of the Year award.

In 2017, Geske was one of 54 former Wisconsin judges who signed a letter advocating for rules requiring judges to recuse themselves in cases involving campaign donors.

References

1949 births
Living people
Beloit College alumni
Marquette University alumni
Marquette University faculty
Marquette University Law School alumni
Milwaukee County Executives
People from Cedarburg, Wisconsin
Politicians from Milwaukee
Wisconsin state court judges
Justices of the Wisconsin Supreme Court
American women judges
American women academics
American legal scholars
Lawyers from Milwaukee
People from Port Washington, Wisconsin
American women legal scholars
21st-century American women
20th-century American women judges
20th-century American judges